Happiness for Two (Stestí pro dva) is a 1940 Czechoslovak musical film, directed by Miroslav Cikán. It stars  Jarmila Ksírová, Jindra Hermanová, Stanislav Neumann.

References

External links
Happiness for Two at the Internet Movie Database

1940 films
Czechoslovak musical films
1940 musical films
Films directed by Miroslav Cikán
Czechoslovak black-and-white films
Czech musical films
1940s Czech films